Sam Byrne may refer to:

 Sam Byrne (footballer) (born 1995), Irish professional footballer
 Sam Byrne (painter) (1883–1978), Australian naïve painter and folk historian